William Watson (birth unknown – death unknown) was an English professional rugby league footballer who played in the 1920s and 1930s, and coached in the 1940s.

Background
Billy Watson was born in Keighley, West Riding of Yorkshire, England.

Playing career
Billy Watson played  for the Yorkshire League versus Lancashire League at Craven Park, Barrow on 23 March 1940, in a strong front-row with Hudson Irving (Halifax) and Frank Whitcombe (Bradford Northern).

International honours
Billy Watson represented Rugby League XIII while at Keighley in 1934 against France, and won caps for England while at Keighley in 1934 against Australia, and France.

Challenge Cup Final appearances
Billy Watson played  in Huddersfield's 8-11 defeat by Castleford in the 1935 Challenge Cup Final during the 1934–35 season at Wembley Stadium, London on Saturday 4 May 1935, in front of a crowd of 39,000.

Note
The 'englandrl.co.uk' website states that Billy Watson won caps for England while at Keighley in 1934 against Australia and France, however the 'rugbyleagueproject.org' website states that he also won caps for England in 1938 against Wales.

References

England national rugby league team players
English rugby league players
Huddersfield Giants players
Keighley Cougars players
Place of death missing
Rugby league hookers
Rugby league locks
Rugby League XIII players
Rugby league props
Rugby league players from Keighley
Year of birth missing
Year of death missing
Yorkshire rugby league team players